GripShift is a video game developed by Sidhe and co-published by Red Mile Entertainment, Sony Online Entertainment and Ubisoft for the PlayStation Portable handheld in 2005. The game was later released to download on PlayStation 3 via the PlayStation Store (and is no longer available to purchase since 2014), and for the Xbox 360 via Xbox Live Arcade. GripShift is a cross between a puzzle-platform game like Super Monkey Ball and a driving game like Stunt Car Racer.

Gameplay

GripShift is a racing video game. The PSP version features official downloadable tracks at the official website. The "Turbo Expansion Pack" downloadable content was released on February 13, 2008, exclusively for the Xbox 360 version.  The content adds new single-player and multiplayer modes, eight Race Tracks, eight Deathmatch Arenas, and eighteen new music tracks.

Reception

The game received "average" reviews on all platforms according to the review aggregation website Metacritic.  In Japan, Famitsu gave the PSP version a score of three sevens and one six for a total of 27 out of 40.

At the 2005 Australian Game Developers Conference GripShift won "Best Handheld Game", "Best Level Design" and "Best Game Design". In late 2005 IGN awarded GripShift runner-up to Lumines for the most innovative design for a handheld game in their annual Game of the Year Awards. GripShift also won "Best Handheld Game" in the 2005 Sumea awards.

See also
 Racing Destruction Set
 Stunts, a similar game
 Trackmania, a similar game

References

External links
 
 GripShift at SOE
 

2005 video games
Multiplayer online games
PlayStation 3 games
PlayStation Network games
PlayStation Portable games
Puzzle-platform games
Racing video games
Sony Interactive Entertainment games
Ubisoft games
Video games developed in New Zealand
Xbox 360 Live Arcade games
PhyreEngine games
Sidhe (company) games
Multiplayer and single-player video games